The Capital District Islanders were a team in the American Hockey League based in Troy, New York, which is located within a region popularly called the Capital District. The Islanders were the principal minor league affiliate of the National Hockey League's New York Islanders during the 1990–91, 1991–92 and 1992–93 seasons.

The Islanders were born out of an effort to coax an AHL team into Albany's newly built Knickerbocker Arena.  However, the Adirondack Red Wings, based in Glens Falls, had long claimed the Capital District as part of its home territory, and initially refused to allow an AHL expansion team to play in Albany.

Those plans changed when the International Hockey League expanded eastward out of its Great Lakes stronghold to move the Fort Wayne Komets to Knickerbocker Arena as the Albany Choppers.  By this time, the IHL had firmly established itself as the AHL's equal, and the AHL was unnerved by this encroachment into its Northeastern heartland.  It sought to sabotage the Choppers by locating another team in the Albany area. It hastily granted an expansion team to a group headed by one of the suitors for an Albany AHL franchise, car dealer Michael Cantanucci.  The new team would play at Rensselaer Polytechnic Institute's Houston Field House on its Troy campus. It quickly secured an affiliation with the NHL Islanders, bringing with them most of the players who had been on the Calder Cup champion Springfield Indians the previous year.  In the ensuing price and attendance wars, the Choppers folded midseason.

The Islanders' best record was in the 1992–93 season, when the team finished 34-34-12 for third place in its division and a playoff berth.  Among the team's notable players were Greg Parks, its leading career scorer in only one and a half seasons; forwards Richard Kromm and Brent Grieve, defensemen Dennis Vaske, Jeff Finley and Dean Chynoweth and goaltender Danny Lorenz.

In 1993, Cantanucci sold the franchise to local insurance magnate Albert Lawrence.  Lawrence renamed the team the Albany River Rats, changed its affiliation to the New Jersey Devils, and moved the team to Albany's Knickerbocker Arena, the same arena in which the Albany Choppers played in 1990.  The current AHL affiliation of the New York Islanders is the Bridgeport Islanders.

Season-by-season results
Regular season

Playoffs

References

Ice hockey teams in New York (state)
Defunct American Hockey League teams
Defunct ice hockey teams in the United States
Ice hockey clubs established in 1990
Ice hockey clubs disestablished in 1993
Sports in Rensselaer County, New York
Defunct sports teams in New York (state)
New York Islanders minor league affiliates
1990 establishments in New York (state)
1993 disestablishments in New York (state)
Troy, New York